Franco Enna (1921-1990) was the best known pseudonym of Francesco Cannarozzo, an Italian writer. He was born in Castrogiovanni (now known as Enna), Sicily, on the 16 September 1921, the son of a police sergeant, and died at Lugano, Switzerland, on 19 July 1990. For his work, he was awarded the Eunus Prize by the Kiwanis Club of Enna, in 1986.

Writing 

Francesco Cannarozzo was a poet, a playwright, a journalist, and a prolific writer of detective novels and science fiction. He was best known as Franco Enna, but also wrote under his true name as well as many English pseudonyms, including Lou Happings, Andrew Maxwell, James Douglas, Thomas Freed, Richard Shell, Lewis Allen Scott, Herry Graham, Max Reditone, and Carlton Gibbs.

Much of his work was published in the science fiction magazine Urania. He became very well known among science fiction fans following the publication in Urania of his novel L'astro lebbroso in March 1955.

His early detective novels were largely set in foreign locations, but in the 1970s he moved to more familiar Italian locales, notably in Mamma lupara ("Mother shotgun") published in 1972, and in the series of books about Federico Sartori. Franco Enna came to be known as the writer who "provincialised" Italian crime fiction. Italo Calvino and Alberto Savinio had said that the Italian countryside could not be the background to a thriller. Enna used the format of a detective novel as an opportunity to show his view of the world. Sicily became the perfect setting to tell stories filled with intrigue and steeped in passion.

Enna's best known character was inspector Federico Sartori, a Sicilian police officer plagued by incurable nostalgia, who was led easily by adventure and by love through intricate and compelling stories. Around this character Franco Enna developed a wealth of fictional episodes which had considerable public success and earned him the nickname of "the Italian Simenon".

References 

1921 births
1990 deaths
People from Enna
Writers from Sicily
Italian male journalists
Italian male poets
Italian science fiction writers
20th-century Italian novelists
20th-century Italian male writers
20th-century Italian poets
Italian male novelists
20th-century Italian journalists